Euseius caseariae is a species of mite in the family Phytoseiidae.

References

caseariae
Articles created by Qbugbot
Animals described in 1967